The 2022 Boston Marathon was a marathon race held in Boston, Massachusetts, on April 18, 2022. It was the 124th official running of the race (excludes no race in 2020, and the ekiden of 1918). The field was limited to 30,000 runners.

Background
The marathon returned to its traditional Patriots' Day schedule for the first time since 2019. All participants were required to be fully vaccinated against COVID-19.

Lawrence Cherono and Benson Kipruto, both from Kenya, were among the elite runners expected to compete.

On April 6, race organizers announced that runners residing in Russia or Belarus would not be allowed to participate, due to the Russian invasion of Ukraine. That decision subsequently drew criticism from an editorial in The Boston Globe.

Results
The elite men's and women's races were won by Kenyans Evans Chebet and Peres Jepchirchir, respectively. Wheelchair races were won by Daniel Romanchuk of the US (men) and Manuela Schär of Switzerland (women). Wheelchair racer Marcel Hug withdrew hours before the race started, for an unknown reason.

Olympic bronze medalist Molly Seidel, who had a hip impingement, dropped out of the race at around  due to a hip injury. This was the first time she ran in the Boston Marathon.

Men

Women

Wheelchair men

Wheelchair women

References

Further reading

External links
Official website
Race program

Boston Marathon
Boston Marathon
Boston Marathon
Boston Marathon
Boston Marathon
Marathon